Democrat Township is one of fourteen townships in Carroll County, Indiana. As of the 2010 census, its population was 885 and it contained 354 housing units.

History
Democrat Township was organized in 1835.

Adams Mill and Adams Mill Covered Bridge are listed on the National Register of Historic Places.

Geography

Unincorporated towns
 Adams Mill
 Cutler
 Lexington
 Prince William
 Ray

Adjacent townships
 Monroe (north)
 Burlington (east)
 Warren Township, Clinton County (southeast)
 Owen Township, Clinton County (south)
 Ross Township, Clinton County (southwest)
 Clay (west)
 Madison (west)

Major highways
  Indiana State Road 75

Education
Democrat Township residents may obtain a library card at the Flora-Monroe Township Public Library in Flora.

References
 
 United States Census Bureau cartographic boundary files

External links
 Indiana Township Association
 United Township Association of Indiana

Townships in Carroll County, Indiana
Lafayette metropolitan area, Indiana
Townships in Indiana
1835 establishments in Indiana